Maricel Regal Drama Special is a Philippine anthology drama series and broadcast which was aired on ABS-CBN from November 17, 1987, to March 20, 1989, and was replaced by The Maricel Drama Special.

See also
List of programs broadcast by ABS-CBN

References

1987 Philippine television series debuts
1989 Philippine television series endings
1980s Philippine television series
ABS-CBN original programming
Filipino-language television shows
Philippine anthology television series